Luis Paz (1854–1928) was a Bolivian jurist.

Luis Paz may also refer to:
 Luis Paz (footballer) (1939–2015), Colombian footballer
 Luis Paz (swimmer) (born 1945), Peruvian swimmer